Something Sacred is a collaborative album by rappers Chino XL and Playalitical. It was released on January 15, 2008.

Track listing

2008 albums
Hip hop albums by American artists
Chino XL albums